Mirza Muhammad Yusuf Ali (1858-1920) was a Bengali writer and reformer of British India.

Early life
Mirza Muhammad Yusuf Ali was born in 1858 at Aliabad village in Rajshahi district. He studied in Sreedharpur Madhyabanga Vidyalay then in Rajshahi Normal School. Though passed in quarterly examination he could not continue his study and passed the Entrance exam in 1887 as a private candidate instead of regular candidate. In 1889 he could not pass the F.A. examination and did not continue his study. Apart from Bengali and English he learned Arabic, Persian and Urdu on his own.

Career
He began his career joining as a teacher in school of Cooch Behar. He was also teacher in Loknath School and Rangpur Government Normal School. He served as school-inspector and sub-registrar. He retired in 1917.

Social reform
After retirement Yusuf Ali involved himself in social reform. He was founder secretary of Nur-al-Iman Society (1884), Anjuman-e-Hemayate Islam (1891) and Rajshahi Zila Mussalman Education Society (1918). He had notable contribution in establishment of Fuller Hostel of Rajshahi and Muslim Hostel of Naogan. He was editor of newspaper Nur-al-Iman (1900), Shiksa Samachar and Shiksa Samabay (1919).

Literature
His first book Dugdha-Sarobar first published in 1891. He translated Al-Ghazali's Kimiya-yi sa'ādat in Bengali as Saubhagya Sparshamani in 1895.

Death
Mirza Muhammad Yusuf Ali died on 30 May 1920.

References

1858 births
1920 deaths
Bengali writers
People from Rajshahi District